Pow! is an album by saxophonist Sonny Stitt featuring trombonist Benny Green recorded in 1965 and released on the Prestige label in 1967.

Reception

Allmusic awarded the album 4 stars stating "Altoist Sonny Stitt and trombonist Benny Green make for a potent team on this spirited quintet set... the two distinctive horns (along with pianist Kirk Lightsey, bassist Herman Wright and drummer Roy Brooks) have little difficulty essaying these bop pieces, blues and ballads, and their personable styles match well together".

Track listing 
All compositions by Carpenter and Bruce except as indicated
 "I Want to Be Happy" (Vincent Youmans, Irving Caesar) - 8:27   
 "Love on the Rocks" - 6:49   
 "Blue Lights" - 7:41   
 "Scramble" - 6:54   
 "Up and Over" - 4:11   
 "Pride and Passion" - 4:47   
 "'Nuff Guff" - 7:41

Personnel 
Sonny Stitt - alto saxophone, tenor saxophone
Benny Green - trombone
Kirk Lightsey - piano
Herman Wright - bass 
Roy Brooks - drums

References 

1967 albums
Prestige Records albums
Sonny Stitt albums